Netherlands is an unincorporated community in Pemiscot County, in the U.S. state of Missouri.

History
A post office called Netherlands was in operation from 1915 until 1957. The community was named after Wood Netherlands, a land agent who was interested in buying fields in the rural area the CDP is in.

References

Unincorporated communities in Pemiscot County, Missouri
Unincorporated communities in Missouri